Spilosoma castelli is a moth in the family Erebidae. It was described by Walter Rothschild in 1933. It is found in Senegal and Nigeria.

Subspecies
Spilosoma castelli castelli (Senegal)
Spilosoma castelli grandis Rothschild, 1933 (Nigeria)

References

castelli
Moths of Africa
Lepidoptera of West Africa
Moths described in 1933
Taxa named by Walter Rothschild